Muhamed Filipović (3 August 1929 – 26 February 2020) was a Bosnian academic, writer, essayist, theorist and philosopher. As a young man he took part in the communist takeover of power and Yugoslav Partisans in 1945. He worked as a professor at the Faculty of Philosophy at the University of Sarajevo. 

Some authors see him as one of the leading late 20th and early 21st century Bosniak academics.

Early life
Filipović was born on 3 August 1929 in Banja Luka, Bosnia and Herzegovina, then a part of the Kingdom of Yugoslavia to Sulejman Filipović and his wife Đula. His mothers first cousins were Džafer and Osman Kulenović. 

He bore the surname Filipović, not only after his father but also after his mother. The Filipović family from his paternal side hail from Glamoč, Bosnia and Herzegovina.

Career
Filipović graduated from the Faculty of Philosophy and received his doctorate in 1960. He was a member and president of the Academy of Sciences and Arts of Bosnia and Herzegovina.

He worked as a professor at the Faculty of Philosophy of the University of Sarajevo. He published 56 books, some of which have been translated into other languages. His book “Lenin – A Monograph of His Thought” has been translated into Danish, Swedish, French, Bulgarian, Slovak, Italian and Chinese.

He was a founder and leader of the Muslim Bosniak Organization (MBO). 

At the beginning of the Party of Democratic Action (SDA, est. 1990), the party also included a very influential secular nationalist grouping, led by Adil Zulfikarpašić and Muhamed Filipović. 
He led a delegation and negotiated both with presidents of Croatia and Slovenia republics in SFRY, who invited Bosnia to join them on the planned path to secession, and later in June 1991, on behalf of SDA president Alija Izetbegović, Zulfikarpašić and Filipović met with SDS president Radovan Karadžić, Nikola Koljević and Momčilo Krajišnik to discuss the future status of SR Bosnia and Herzegovina. He then met with representatives of Serbia who invited Bosnia to stay. Both proposals were rejected by Bosniak leaders at the time. He considered especially tragic that proposal to stay in Yugoslavia together with Macedonia, Serbia and Montenegro was rejected by Alija Izetbegović, after very successful negotiations with Slobodan Milošević, who agreed to all of his numerous demands - from Bosniak president and army chief of Yugoslavia to preserving unity of Bosnia within Yugoslavia. 

During the Bosnian War, he was the ambassador to the United Kingdom.

References

1929 births
2020 deaths
People from Banja Luka
Bosniaks of Bosnia and Herzegovina
Bosniak writers
Yugoslav dissidents
Bosnia and Herzegovina philosophers
20th-century philosophers
20th-century Bosnia and Herzegovina historians
Bosnian nationalism
Burials at Bare Cemetery, Sarajevo
Members of the Academy of Sciences and Arts of Bosnia and Herzegovina